John Tarleton (29 June 1852 – 31 December 1929) was a New Zealand cricketer. He played in one first-class match for Wellington in 1884/85.

See also
 List of Wellington representative cricketers

References

External links
 

1852 births
1929 deaths
New Zealand cricketers
Wellington cricketers
Cricketers from Tasmania